Kenmore is a village in Erie County, New York, United States. The population was 15,423 at the 2010 census. It is part of the Buffalo–Niagara Falls metropolitan area.

Kenmore is in the south part of the town of Tonawanda, and together with the town it is often referred to as "Ken-Ton". It is bordered to the south by the city of Buffalo. The village is in the northwest part of Erie County.

The village has received accolades: In 2009, the American Planning Association named Kenmore "One of the Top 10 Great Neighborhoods" in the United States. The village is also one of the country's 100 most densely populated incorporated places. And in 2011, Buffalo Business First named Kenmore the highest-rated community in Western New York.

History 
The village of Kenmore was incorporated in 1899 from part of the town of Tonawanda. It is known as "Buffalo's First Suburb".

Louis Eberhardt, known as the "father of Kenmore", opposed naming the village "Eberhardt" after himself. He was responsible for buying farmland and subdividing the property into a suburban development. The building which is portrayed on the village logo is the Eberhardt Mansion, located at the corner of Delaware Avenue and Kenmore Avenue. It was listed on the National Register of Historic Places in 1983. The Kenmore Village Hall was listed in 2013 as the Tonawanda Municipal Building.

Geography
Kenmore is located at  (42.964907, -78.871679).

Adjacent cities and towns
 Town of Tonawanda - west, north, east
 Buffalo - south

Major highways

  New York State Route 265 (Military Rd.), north–south roadway that provides the west village line.
  New York State Route 384 (Delaware Ave.), north–south roadway through the village from Tonawanda south into Buffalo.
 Elmwood Avenue (Erie CR 119), important north–south roadway through the village
 Kenmore Avenue (Erie CR 307), east–west roadway that forms the south village line.

Demographics

As of the census of 2000, there were 16,426 people, 7,071 households, and 4,235 families residing in the village. The population density was 11,437.2 people per square mile (4,404.2/km2), one of the densest populations in the United States. There were 7,459 housing units at an average density of 5,193.6 per square mile (2,000.0/km2). The racial makeup of the village was 96.85% White, 0.99% African American, 0.35% Native American, 0.58% Asian, 0.04% Pacific Islander, 0.35% from other races, and 0.83% from two or more races. Hispanic or Latino of any race were 1.30% of the population.

There were 7,071 households, out of which 28.7% had children under the age of 18 living with them, 45.3% were married couples living together, 11.6% had a female householder with no husband present, and 40.1% were non-families. 34.8% of all households were made up of individuals, and 15.6% had someone living alone who was 65 years of age or older. The average household size was 2.31 and the average family size was 3.04.

In the village, the population was spread out, with 23.3% under the age of 18, 7.4% from 18 to 24, 30.5% from 25 to 44, 22.5% from 45 to 64, and 16.4% who were 65 years of age or older. The median age was 38 years. For every 100 females, there were 86.3 males. For every 100 females age 18 and over, there were 81.9 males.

The median income for a household in the village was $42,252, and the median income for a family was $53,155. Males had a median income of $38,371 versus $26,875 for females. The per capita income for the village was $21,695. About 3.5% of families and 5.2% of the population were below the poverty line, including 5.8% of those under age 18 and 4.6% of those age 65 or over.

Government
The village government consists of a mayor and four trustees, each elected to a four-year term. The current mayor is Patrick Mang.

Notable people
Adrian Adonis, pro wrestler 
Zach Anner, stand-up comedian
Wolf Blitzer, journalist and news anchor
Jonah Heim, American professional baseball catcher for the Texas Rangers
Green Jellÿ, punk band
Rusty Jeffers, professional bodybuilder
Gerda Weissmann Klein, Holocaust historian and recipient of the Medal of Freedom 
Beth Krom, former mayor of Irvine, California
Jill Krowinski, current Speaker of the House, Vermont House of Representatives
Chris Lee, former US congressman 
John Massé, animator
Chuck McCoy, radio personality, comedian, YouTube creator
Dan McFall, retired NHL player
Bernard Joseph McLaughlin, Roman Catholic bishop
James McLernon, retired automobile company executive
Walter M. Noel Jr., of Fairfield Greenwich Group
Jerry Ross, painter
Vesta M. Roy, former acting governor of New Hampshire
Robin Schimminger, former New York state assemblyman

References

External links
 Village of Kenmore official website
 Kenmore Business Association

Villages in New York (state)
Buffalo–Niagara Falls metropolitan area
Villages in Erie County, New York